Waldemar Stępień (born 10 June 1946) is a retired Polish long jumper.

He finished fourteenth at the 1970 European Indoor Championships. He also competed at the 1969 European Championships without reaching the final. He became Polish champion in 1969.

His personal best jump was 8.21 metres, achieved in July 1969 in Chorzow.

References

1946 births
Living people
Polish male long jumpers
People from Szczecinek County
Sportspeople from West Pomeranian Voivodeship